The Plymouth-Canton Marching Band (PCMB) is a nationally recognized marching band program located on the campus of the Plymouth-Canton Educational Park in Canton, Michigan, United States.

Music program
The PCMB is part of a broader fine arts program offered in the Plymouth-Canton Community Schools. Its Wind Ensemble, Chamber Winds, and Symphony bands have consistently rated among the best in the state of Michigan. PCEP band students and alumni have performed with the Detroit Symphony Orchestra, the Detroit Civic Youth Orchestra, the Michigan Youth Band, the National Honor Band of America, and the MSBOA All State Honor Band and Orchestra. The concert program is taught by Director of Bands Michael Wells along with the associate director of bands: Andrew Raven and Oliver Rodriguez

Staff

Previous staff have included Marc Whitlock (2003–2007), current music director for Discovery Middle School; Andy Ebert (2004–2007), current Visual Caption Head at Carolina Crown and West Bloomfield High School; Martin Montoya (2005–2008), director at Brazoswood High School in Clute, Texas; Clayton Wachholz (2001–2003,2016); David McGrath (1995–2001), current Director of Bands at Kennesaw Mountain High School in Kennesaw, Georgia; Jonathan Ovalle (1995–2006), current Assistant Professor of Percussion at the University of Michigan; Steven McGuire (1998–2002) former assistant director at Mariner High School in Cape Coral, FL; Jed Leach (2007–2008), Current Percussion director for Georgetown High School in Georgetown, TX,; Rob Myers (1998–2000), current Director of Instrumental Music for Dallas ISD.  Alan Spaeth (1993 and 1997–2003) Color Guard and show design; Mitch Rogers (1992–2003), drill designer for the Stephen F. Austin Marching Band, Carlton J. Kell High School, Glen Adsit (1989–1994), current Director of Bands at The Hartt School in Hartford, Connecticut; Don Booher, Chris (Gale) Booher, Patrick Ruddy, Tom Fikes, Chad Jacobs, Jonathan Miller, Casey Swanson, George Hester, David Kline, Benjamin Clark, Mark Hart, John Shaw, Dan Arreola Ian Horste, Ryan Noe, and Sheldon Frazier (currently associate director at McEachern High School in Powder Springs, GA). Sean McElroy, Scott Beck, Emery Craig, currently in United States Army band, Dick Eathorne, and Ross Blackley.

Their current staff includes Oliver Rodriguez, Percussion Director, Noah Bellamy, visual caption head, John Hartwick, brass caption head, Mark Istratie,  Color Guard caption head,  Mike Wells, Head Director, and Andrew Raven, Assistant Director.

Legendary drill writer Steve Brubaker wrote the drill for Plymouth's first national championship which also featured uniforms designed by Steve Cesario.

James Griffith served as Plymouth's Director of Bands until his retirement in 1994. Griffith is widely respected as one of the preeminent music educators in the state of Michigan.

Awards and honors
Since the mid-1970s, the Plymouth Canton Marching Band has become one of the most consistent high school marching bands in Southeast Michigan. Within the state of Michigan, the PCMB has been a state champion 25 times, an honor shared with no other groups in Michigan, (both Fine Arts and Athletics), and only with one other group in the country: the Marian Catholic High School Marching Band. Upon entering the Bands of America in 1986, Plymouth-Canton has been a National Finalist (Top 12) all but three years since 1988. This has honor has been exceeded only by the Marian Catholic High School Band.  The Plymouth-Canton Marching Band has won more than 500 awards in 16 years. The band has also been to the Tostitos Fiesta Bowl Tournament of Bands in 1992 & 1996, winning the prestigious competition both years.

Outside of the competition, the band has had the distinction of playing for Presidents Ronald Reagan, in 1986, and George H. W. Bush, in 1992, marching in Orlando, FL, the 1974 King Orange (Bowl) Parade, the 1973 Tournament of Roses Parade, the 1973 Battle of the Bands shown nationally immediately prior to the Rose Parade, the Hudson's Christmas parade Santa's band as well as representing the community in various parades throughout the summer. In 2011, the band marched in the Macy's Thanksgiving Day Parade in New York City, and returned to the Tournament of Roses Parade in 2016.

Competitive results and repertoire

Winter programs
The PCMB also runs three very successful winter programs through the Michigan Color Guard Circuit and Winter Guard International. Both Winter Guards (A & World) have been State Champions  and the Open guard is a two time WGI Open Class Finalist.

References

External links
The Plymouth-Canton Marching Band's home page

Education in Wayne County, Michigan
High school marching bands from the United States
Musical groups established in 1972